Ran Kojok (born January 12, 1981) is a retired Israeli footballer who now works as the manager of Maccabi Netanya.

Managerial stats
As of 18 March 2023

Honours
Toto Cup:
Winner (1): 2022-23

References

External links
 

1981 births
Living people
Israeli footballers
Footballers from Netanya
Maccabi Netanya F.C. players
Hapoel Ironi Kiryat Shmona F.C. players
Hapoel Acre F.C. players
Hapoel Ashkelon F.C. players
Maccabi Umm al-Fahm F.C. players
Maccabi Kiryat Gat F.C. players
Hapoel Nir Ramat HaSharon F.C. players
Hapoel Beit She'an F.C. players
Hakoah Maccabi Amidar Ramat Gan F.C. players
Israeli Premier League players
Liga Leumit players
Israeli football managers
Maccabi Netanya F.C. managers
Israeli Premier League managers
Israeli people of Romanian-Jewish descent
Association football defenders